Cvijanović (Cyrillic script: Цвијановић) is a Serbian surname derived from the masculine given name Cvijan. Notable people with the surname include:

Adam Cvijanovic (born 1960), American painter
Goran Cvijanović (born 1986), Slovenian footballer
Miroslav Cvijanović (born 1985), Slovenian footballer
Zoran Cvijanović (born 1958), Serbian actor
Željka Cvijanović (born 1967), politician from Bosnia and Herzegovina

Serbian surnames